The Fujifilm X-T30 II is a mirrorless interchangeable-lens camera announced by Fujifilm. The camera, together with the GFX50S II, and some lenses, were announced by Fujifilm during the X Summit in Japan on September 2, 2021. The X-T30 II is a successor to the X-T30, which was released in 2019. The camera will not come with a battery charger and will be sold in two finishes: black and silver.

The X-T30 II is the latest release of the series.

Key features
The X-T30 II is a mirrorless compact camera made by Fujifilm. It measures 118.4 mm × 82.8 mm × 46.8 mm the same measurement as the X-T30 and weighs 378 g, 5 grams less than X-T30, including memory card and battery. 

The Fujifilm X-T30 II inherits the same body of X-T30, but with an equivalent performance of the Fujifilm X-T4.

 X-Trans CMOS 4 sensor
 Increased LCD resolution to 1.62M dots touchscreen
 -7EV autofocus
 High speed 240 frames per second video recording at 1080p

References

External links

X-T30 II
Cameras introduced in 2021